The 1976 Labour Party leadership election occurred when Harold Wilson resigned as Leader of the Labour Party and Prime Minister. It is the only occasion when the Labour Party, whilst in government, has had a leadership election with more than one candidate.

Candidates
The new leader was elected by members of the Parliamentary Labour Party. In the first ballot, held on 25 March, six candidates vied for the leadership:

 Tony Benn, Secretary of State for Energy, Member of Parliament for Bristol South East
 James Callaghan, Foreign Secretary, Member of Parliament for Cardiff South East
 Anthony Crosland, Secretary of State for the Environment, Member of Parliament for Great Grimsby
 Michael Foot, Secretary of State for Employment, Member of Parliament for Ebbw Vale
 Denis Healey, Chancellor of the Exchequer, Member of Parliament for Leeds East
 Roy Jenkins, Home Secretary, Member of Parliament for Birmingham Stechford

In the wake of the news of Wilson's decision to resign, Callaghan was reported as being the favourite to succeed him. Political journalist Geoffrey Parkhouse wrote that "Barring a sensation, James Callaghan will be the next Prime Minister". He argued that the timing favoured Callaghan, with Denis Healey caught up in budget work and having alienated the left wing of the Labour Party after attacking the Tribune group in a recent speech. He doubted whether Crosland or Jenkins would stand, as they were likely to fare better under a Callaghan premiership than they had under Wilson.

Result

As a result of the first ballot, Crosland was eliminated, while Jenkins and Benn withdrew from the contest. The remaining three candidates would face each other in a second ballot, five days later. Benn recommended that his supporters vote for Michael Foot. It was reported in  The Glasgow Herald that Jenkins had withdrawn, despite finishing third, as he had concluded he could not improve on his 56 votes. Indeed, that result was a disappointment to him, as he had expected to receive at least 68 votes. Most of his advisors agreed with his decision to withdraw, though one, Dickson Mabon, attempted to convince him to stay in the contest. In contrast, Denis Healey, despite finishing behind both Jenkins and Benn, reckoned he could pick up votes from many parts of the party. The Herald also characterised the second round of the contest as being to determine who would face Foot in the final ballot, and believed Healey had a chance of pulling ahead of Callaghan.

No candidate achieved an absolute majority; hence, the candidate with the lowest number of votes was eliminated (in this case Healey). Callaghan was reported to be the favourite with his supporters, believing that it was impossible that the left-wing Foot could win the votes of more than half of those who had previously supported the right-wing Healey. However, Foot supporter John Silkin believed that 26 Healey voters would back Foot, more than enough for him to emerge victorious.

A final run-off ballot was held six days later.

Upon his election as Labour leader, Callaghan succeeded Wilson as prime minister.

References

Further reading

1976
1976 elections in the United Kingdom
James Callaghan
Labour Party leadership election